Alter Ego is a studio album by French singer Amanda Lear, released in 1995 by ZYX Music.

Background 
The album was recorded at Metropolis Studio in Milan and PNG Studios in Munich, except for the previously released "Everytime You Touch Me", recorded at Gadda Studio in Bologna. Alter Ego marked Lear's return to Munich, twelve years after she had last recorded there. The album was produced by Michael Gordon and Tubi Forti. The picture used on the cover is an original self-portrait painted by Amanda.

Alter Ego spawned three singles: "Everytime You Touch Me", which first appeared on the Italian compilation Hits and More earlier in 1995, "Peep!", the theme tune to Lear's erotic late night TV show of the same name which she hosted on German channel RTL II, and "Angel Love". Despite numerous remixes and promotion on TV, all three singles were unsuccessful in the charts. The album itself only met with limited commercial success and also failed to chart.

The album was released in Italy in 1996 with an alternate artwork. In 2001, Alter Ego was re-released in Germany with the original artwork as part of the Golden Dance Classics series. In 2004, the complete album was re-released as part of The Queen Is... Amanda – Platinum Edition, a three disc Italian compilation.

Track listing 
 "Alter Ego" (Michael Gordon, Amanda Lear) – 2:01
 "Angel Love" (Michael Gordon, Jens Jordan, Amanda Lear, Helmuth Schmidt) – 4:36
 "Love Me, Love Me Blue" (Giampiero Scalamogna, Amanda Lear) – 3:48
 "Muscle Man" (Michael Gordon, Helmuth Schmidt, Amanda Lear) – 4:15
 "This Man (Dali's Song)" (Michael Gordon, Amanda Lear) – 4:34
 "Peep!" (Michael Gordon, Amanda Lear, Helmuth Schmidt) – 3:56
 "Everytime You Touch Me" (Amanda Lear, Michael Gordon, Helmuth Schmidt) – 3:43
 "On the Air Tonight" (Peter Bardens) – 3:34
 "Rien ne va plus" (Roberto Costa, Amanda Lear, Helmuth Schmidt) – 3:46
 "Go Go Boy (When I Say Go)" (Michael Gordon, Amanda Lear) – 2:01
 "Dance Around the Room" (Peter Bardens) – 4:04
 "I'll Miss You" (Ignazio Polizzy, Claudio Natili, Marcello Ramoino, Amanda Lear, Helmuth Schmidt) – 3:34
 "Alter Ego (Part 2)" (Michael Gordon, Amanda Lear) – 2:07

Personnel 
 Amanda Lear – lead vocals, cover painting
 Carolina Balboni – backing vocals
 Ulli Essmann – backing vocals
 Tubi Forti – record producer (track 7)
 Michael Gordon – record producer, arranger
 Charles Hörnemann – guitar
 Sandrina Löscher – backing vocals

Release history

References

External links 
 Alter Ego at Discogs
 Alter Ego at Rate Your Music

1995 albums
Amanda Lear albums